The International League T20 (ILT20) (also endorsed as the DP World ILT20 for sponsorship reasons) is a ongoing 20-20 cricket tournament being played in the United Arab Emirates. It is sanctioned by Emirates Cricket Board.

The first edition of the tournament was originally scheduled to take place during January and February 2022, but it was rescheduled to take place from January 2023, with six teams competing. In June 2022, the league was formally named the International League T20, with the dates for the first season also being confirmed.

Shah Rukh Khan inaugurated a performence for the first 2023 edition of ILT20.

Overview
Franchises owners from the Indian Premier League (IPL), such as Knight Riders Group, Reliance Industries, GMR Group along with Lancer Capitals and Adani Group were announced as owners of the teams. Three original IPL franchises owners (i.e. the owners of Kolkata Knight Riders, Mumbai Indians, Delhi Capitals) also got the chance to sign up to four players from their current IPL squads.
International League T20 2023 Full schedule

Teams
The following teams and their owners were announced as taking part in the tournament:

Tournament season and results

Rules
Nine out of eleven players on each team can be overseas players, which will be significantly higher than the four or five overseas-player-limit of other major T20 leagues. Two players on each team must be a UAE player and a player from an Associate Member nation respectively.

Reactions 
There has been some controversy around the ILT20's plan to only require one local (UAE) player in the playing XI of each team, with several Full Members calling for regulations requiring a higher minimum number of local players in the ILT20 and other T20 leagues. 108 million people tuned in from across India even though attendance was low. Attendance was low due to lack of participation of Indian, Bangladeshi and Pakistani cricketers.

Players

Broadcasters
In May 2021, Essel Group owned Zee Entertainment Enterprises bought the media rights of this league for ten years at a cost of 120 million.

International Broadcasters:

References

External links
 International League T20 Details

Cricket in the United Arab Emirates
Twenty20 cricket leagues
Emirati domestic cricket competitions
Sports leagues established in 2022
Professional cricket leagues
Professional sports leagues in the United Arab Emirates
Proposed sports leagues